Requien may refer to:
 Musée Requien, a natural history museum in Avignon, France
 Esprit Requien (1788–1851), a French naturalist, who made contributions in the fields of conchology